Datin Paduka Marina binti Tun Dr. Mahathir (born 9 June 1957) (Jawi: مرينة بنت محاضر) is a Malaysian socio-political activist and writer. She is the eldest child of the 4th and 7th Prime Minister of Malaysia, Tun Mahathir Mohamad and Siti Hasmah Mohamad Ali.
She graduated from the University of Sussex.

Career
Marina is a leader in many non-governmental organizations such as the Malaysian AIDS Foundation and is an active socio-political blogger. She also writes in her bi-weekly column called Musings in The Star newspaper since 1989. Some of her pieces in the column have been published in her books such as 50 Days: Rantings by MM, published in 1997 and Telling It Straight, published in 2012 by Editions Didier Millet. The latter is a selection of her articles published in her column between 2003 and 2012. It includes a foreword by Dr Farish A. Noor, a local political scientist and historian. It contains 90 articles which are written thematically including a special written introduction on the topics discussed in the book. It also includes two previously unpublished articles.

She is an active campaigner for women's rights. In 2006 she has described the status of Muslim women in Malaysia as similar to that of the Black South Africans under apartheid.

Marina has called for an end to discrimination based on sexual orientations in 1998 and 1999.

She had appeared in Tun Dr Mahathir Mohamad's Documentary released in late 2009 with the rest of the members of the Mahathir Family.

In 2010, she was awarded UN Person of The Year for her volunteer work in combatting HIV/AIDS.

In 2016 Marina denounced the destruction of Malaysian culture and traditions by what she perceives as 'Arab colonialism'.

In January 2018, following a viral incident of a Muslim man slapping a Muslim woman for not wearing a hijab, Marina warned that Islamization of Malaysia will tear the country apart. She referred to Islamization as "another form of colonisation, a concept that has never been known to being non-violent".

Personal life
On 7 June 1998 Marina married Tara Sosrowardoyo, a renowned Indonesian photographer. They have two daughters and a son.

Previously, she was married to Didier Roussille, a Frenchman. Marina and Didier have a daughter, Ineza Roussille.

Bibliography
50 days : Rantings, ZI Publications Sdn. Bhd, 2009. 
Hidden voices : true Malaysian experience of AIDS, as editor, with Wan Zawawi Ibrahim, Malaysian AIDS Councils, 1999. 
In Liberal Doses, Star Publications, 1997. 
Eyes : a photographic journey through the Association of Southeast Asian Nations, with Rene Burbi and Leonard Lueras, Eyes on Asian, 1993. 
Telling It Straight, EDM Pte Ltd, 2012. 
The Apple and the Tree: Life as Dr Mahathir's Daughter,  Penguin Books, 2021.

Awards and accolades

Honours of Malaysia
  :
  Knight Commander of the Order of the Crown of Selangor (DPMS) – Datin Paduka (1999)

Foreign honours
  :
  Knight of the National Order of the Legion of Honour (2016)

In 2016, Marina was conferred the Chevalier de la Légion d’Honneur by the French government for “her voice and charisma to many causes”, citing her work with the Malaysian AIDS Council and with migrants as examples. Marina became one of eight Malaysians to receive the award so far.

See also

Women in Malaysia
LGBT rights in Malaysia

References

External links
Rantings by MM - Personal Blog
The Star Online: Columnists
Mahathir's daughter makes her own mark
Malaysia’s Résumé - Marina Mahathir

1957 births
Living people
People from Kedah
Malaysian people of Malay descent
Malaysian people of Minangkabau descent
Malaysian people of Indian descent
Malaysian people of Malayali descent
Malaysian activists
Malaysian women activists
Malaysian journalists
Malaysian women journalists
Malaysian bloggers
Malaysian women bloggers
Mahathir Mohamad family
Children of prime ministers of Malaysia
Critics of Islam
Former Muslim critics of Islam
Chevaliers of the Légion d'honneur
Anti-Islam sentiment in Malaysia